Port Haywood is an unincorporated community in Mathews County, in the U. S. state of Virginia.

Notable People:

History
In 1904 Port Haywood was a post village.

References

Unincorporated communities in Virginia
Unincorporated communities in Mathews County, Virginia